The Movimiento Ibérico de Liberación (MIL, sometimes known as 1000) was a Catalan left-wing political and urban guerrilla organisation between 1971 and 1973, based mainly in Barcelona, Spain, and in Toulouse, France. It became famous after its dissolving because of the execution by the Francoist State of one of its members, Salvador Puig Antich, in March 1974, and of the shooting of Oriol Solé Sugranyes during his escape in 1976. One of its French members, Jean-Marc Rouillan, later became a member of the GARI and then of the terrorist group Action Directe.

The MIL advocated violent direct action against Francoist Spain and capitalism, carrying out bank robberies ("expropriations"), allegedly to support the working class' struggle. It was formed by members from various origins, Marxists, anarchists, etc., and supported council communism, situationism and other ultra-leftist theories which were opposed by other left-wing organized parties. The MIL published various books and leaflets prohibited in Spain, such as texts by Camillo Berneri, Antonie Pannekoek and the Situationist International.

They decided to dissolve themselves in August 1973. A month later, most of its members were imprisoned in Barcelona, while others managed to escape to Toulouse where they formed the Groupes d'action révolutionnaire internationalistes (GARI). The GARI launched a campaign in favour of their imprisoned militants and continued violent resistance against Francoist Spain.

References

Further reading 
 Aisa, Ferran et al.  Salvador Puig Antich and the MIL (Moviemiento Iberico de Liberacion). London ; Berkeley : Kate Sharpley Library, 2008.  
 Tajuelo, Telesforo. El Movimiento Ibérico de Liberación, Salvador Puig Antich y los grupos de Acción Revolucionaria Internacionalista: teoría y práctica, 1969-1976. Paris. Ruedo Ibérico, 1977.
 Cortade, André. Le 1000: histoire désordonnée du MIL, Barcelone 1967-1974. Paris. Dérive 17, 1985.
 Téllez Solá, Antonio. El MIL y Puig Antich. Barcelona. Virus, 1994.
 Tolosa, Carlota. La torna de la torna: Salvador Puig Antich i el MIL. Barcelona. Empúries, 1999.
 Rosés Cordovilla, Sergi. El MIL: una historia política. Barcelona. Alikornio, 2002.

External links 
Website of a film documentary on the MIL 
Text of the MIL
Text of the August 1973 dissolution
Response to the film on Salvador Puig Antich
About Salvador Puig Antich & MIL
Documents on the MIL from the Kate Sharpley Library

Anti-Francoism
Communism in Spain
Left-wing militant groups in Spain
Politics of Spain
Communist organizations in Europe
Communist terrorism
Far-left politics in Spain
Terrorism in Spain
Defunct communist militant groups
Politics of Catalonia